Leaving Normal is a 1992 American comedy-drama road film directed by Edward Zwick and starring Christine Lahti and Meg Tilly. Written by Ed Solomon, the film is about the cross country adventure of two women and the hardships and characters they encounter.

Plot
Darly Peters is a brassy waitress and former stripper who used to use the stage name Pillow Talk. Darly is on her way to Alaska to claim a home being built for her and return to the family she abandoned eighteen years earlier. She meets Marianne Johnson, a quiet waif who just walked out on her abusive husband. Darly allows Marianne to tag along as they journey across country to Alaska.

Along the way, they meet a collection of colorful characters, including a strange-talking waitress named 66, and Walt, a road guy who recognizes Darly as the former Pillow Talk and wants to pay her big money for sex.

The women finally make it to Alaska, where Darly finds that the house she was expecting to find has never been built. The two set up in a house trailer and, with the Alaskan wilderness as a backdrop, they begin to reevaluate their lives.

Cast

 Meg Tilly as Marianne Johnson
 Christine Lahti as Darly Peters
 Lenny Von Dohlen as Harry Rainey
 Maury Chaykin as Leon "Crazy-As" Pendleton
 Patrika Darbo as 66
 Eve Gordon as Emily Singer
 James Eckhouse as Rich Singer
 Brett Cullen as Kurt
 James Gammon as Walt
 Lachlan Murdoch as Marshall
 Robyn Simons as Sarah
 Ken Angel as Nuqaq
 Darrell Dennis as Clyde
 Barbara Russell as Izuzu Mother
 Ahnee Boyce as Izuzu Judy
 Marc Levy as Dave
 Peter Anderson as Spicy
 Gordon Tootoosis as Hank Amaruk
 Rutanya Alda as Palmer Hospital Nurse
 Ray Godshall as Mort
 Tom Heaton as Alec
 Deirdre O'Connell as Ellen 
 Gordon Tipple as Danny
 John 'Bear' Curtis as Michael
 Paul Jarrett as Charlie
 Ed Solomon as Jerk in Bar
 Andrew Johnston as Nearest Guy
 Benjamin Ratner as Next Nearest Guy 
 Timothy Webber as Spicy's Friend
 Sam Bob as Delivery Guy
 Marlane O'Brien as Clara
 Brenda McDonald as Motel Clerk

Production
Filming locations
 Hyder, Alaska, USA
 Stewart, British Columbia, Canada
 Britannia Beach, British Columbia, Canada 
 Vancouver, British Columbia, Canada 
 Yoho National Park, British Columbia, Canada

Reception
Critical response
The film received mixed-to-negative reviews. On the aggregate review site Rotten Tomatoes, the film received a 40% favorable rating from critics.

References

External links

 Leaving Normal at Film.com

1992 films
1990s female buddy films
1990s drama road movies
American female buddy films
American drama road movies
1990s English-language films
Films directed by Edward Zwick
Films set in Alaska
Films set in Wyoming
Films shot in Alaska
Films shot in British Columbia
Films with screenplays by Ed Solomon
Universal Pictures films
1992 drama films
1990s American films